Humboldt is a village in Coles County, Illinois, United States. At the 2020 census, its population was 361. It is part of the Charleston-Mattoon Micropolitan Statistical Area.

History
The village was incorporated on April 16, 1878. The village was named after Alexander von Humboldt, a German natural scientist.

Geography

Demographics

As of the 2020 census there were 361 people, 185 households, and 112 families residing in the village. The racial makeup of the village was 87.53% White, 1.39% African American, 0.28% Native American, 6.65% from other races, and 4.16% from two or more races. Hispanic or Latino of any race were 11.08% of the population.

There were 185 households, out of which 55.14% had children under the age of 18 living with them, 45.41% were married couples living together, 12.97% had a female householder with no husband present, and 39.46% were non-families. 31.89% of all households were made up of individuals, and 14.59% had someone living alone who was 65 years of age or older. The average household size was 3.11 and the average family size was 2.41.

The village's age distribution consisted of 27.1% under the age of 18, 7.6% from 18 to 24, 22.4% from 25 to 44, 30.3% from 45 to 64, and 12.6% who were 65 years of age or older. The median age was 41.3 years. For every 100 females, there were 98.2 males. For every 100 females age 18 and over, there were 94.6 males.

The median income for a household in the village was $39,875, and the median income for a family was $63,750. Males had a median income of $36,705 versus $26,875 for females. The per capita income for the village was $22,972. About 9.8% of families and 12.7% of the population were below the poverty line, including 11.3% of those under age 18 and 3.6% of those age 65 or over.

References

Charleston–Mattoon, IL Micropolitan Statistical Area
Villages in Coles County, Illinois
Villages in Illinois
Populated places established in 1878